The Making of the Atomic Bomb is a contemporary history book written by the American journalist and historian Richard Rhodes, first published by Simon & Schuster in 1987. It won the Pulitzer Prize for General Non-Fiction, the National Book Award for Nonfiction, and a National Book Critics Circle Award. The narrative covers people and events from early 20th century discoveries leading to the science of nuclear fission, through the Manhattan Project and the atomic bombings of Hiroshima and Nagasaki.

Praised both by historians and former Los Alamos weapon engineers and scientists, the book is considered a general authority on early nuclear weapons history, as well as the development of modern physics in general, during the first half of the 20th century. Nobel Laureate I. I. Rabi, one of the prime participants in the dawn of the atomic age, called it "an epic worthy of Milton. No where else have I seen the whole story put down with such elegance and gusto and in such revealing detail and simple language which carries the reader through wonderful and profound scientific discoveries and their application."

References

Further reading

External links
 

Books about the Manhattan Project
Pulitzer Prize for General Non-Fiction-winning works
National Book Award for Nonfiction winning works
Non-fiction books about military history of the United States
History books about World War II
1986 non-fiction books